Björn Daníel Sverrisson is an Icelandic footballer who currently plays for FH as a midfielder.

Career
Björn has played club football in Iceland and Norway for FH and Viking FK.

Björn signed with Danish club AGF in 2018, but at the end of his contract which was at the end of the year, he left again.

He made his international debut for Iceland in 2014.

Career statistics

Notes

References

External links

Living people
1990 births
Bjorn Daniel Sverrisson
Bjorn Daniel Sverrisson
Bjorn Daniel Sverrisson
Bjorn Daniel Sverrisson
Association football midfielders
Bjorn Daniel Sverrisson
Viking FK players
Aarhus Gymnastikforening players
Vejle Boldklub players
Bjorn Daniel Sverrisson
Eliteserien players
Danish Superliga players
Danish 1st Division players
Bjorn Daniel Sverrisson
Expatriate footballers in Norway
Bjorn Daniel Sverrisson
Expatriate men's footballers in Denmark
Bjorn Daniel Sverrisson